Hickey Park is an Australian rules football ground in Stafford, a suburb of Brisbane, Queensland, Australia. It is the primary home ground for Wilston Grange in the Queensland Australian Football League. It has also been featured in the AFL Women's, hosting its first AFLW game on 17 February 2019 in a match between Brisbane and Melbourne.

References

External links
Hickey Park at Austadiums

Brisbane Lions
AFL Women's grounds
Sports venues in Brisbane